Devrekani District is a district of the Kastamonu Province of Turkey. Its seat is the town of Devrekani. Its area is 715 km2, and its population is 12,132 (2021).

Composition
There is one municipality in Devrekani District:
 Devrekani

There are 54 villages in Devrekani District:

 Ahlatçık
 Akçapınar
 Akdoğan
 Akmescit
 Alaçay
 Alçılar
 Alınören
 Arslanbey
 Asarcık
 Balabanlar
 Baltıcak
 Başakpınar
 Başakpınartepe
 Belovacık
 Bınkıldayık
 Bozarmut
 Bozkoca
 Bozkocatepe
 Çatak
 Çavuşlu
 Çontay
 Çorbacı
 Çörekçi
 Doğuörcünler
 Elmalıtekke
 Erenler
 Fakılar
 Göynükören
 Habeşli
 Hasırlı
 İnciğez
 Kadıoğlu
 Kanlıabat
 Karaçam
 Karayazıcılar
 Kasaplar
 Kınık
 Kızacık
 Kurtköy
 Kuzköy
 Laçin
 Örenbaşı
 Pınarözü
 Saraydurak
 Sarıyonca
 Sarpınalınca
 Selahattinköy
 Sinantekke
 Şenlik
 Şeyhbali
 Tekkekızıllar
 Ulamış
 Yazıbelen
 Yazıhisar

References

Districts of Kastamonu Province